The Cartoon Art Trust Award or CAT Awards are presented in an annual award ceremony hosted by the Cartoon Art Trust (CAT), owners and operators of the Cartoon Museum, to honour the year's best cartoonists. The 21st Cartoon Art Trust Awards were held on 12 October 2017 at the Mall Galleries in London.

History
The Cartoon Art Trust was formed in 1988 by a group of cartoonists and collectors, including the cartoonist Mel Calman, whose aim was to found a museum dedicated to "collecting, exhibiting, promoting and preserving the best of British cartoon art". In February 2006 the Cartoon Museum opened to the public at its current home in central London, close to the British Museum. 

The museum declares it is "dedicated to preserving the best of British cartoons, caricatures, comics and animation, and to establishing a museum with a gallery, archives and innovative exhibitions to make the creativity of cartoon art past and present, accessible to all for the purposes of education, research and enjoyment."

Annual ceremony
The ceremony takes place annually in October in London. The 21st CAT Awards were held at the Mall Galleries in London on 12 October 2017. The awards are sponsored by a number of newspapers including The Daily Mail, Private Eye and The Daily Telegraph. Among the cartoonists whose work has been recognised is Matt Pritchett who has won Best Pocket Cartoonist three times.

Awards categories

See also
 British Cartoonists' Association
 Cartoon Art Trust
 Cartoon Museum
 Young Cartoonist of the Year Award

References

External links
 

Awards established in 1996
Annual events in the United Kingdom